The Civil Procedure Rule Committee is an advisory non-departmental public body within the Government of the United Kingdom which makes rules for the Civil Division of the Court of Appeal, High Court and County Court.

External links 
 https://www.gov.uk/government/organisations/civil-procedure-rules-committee

Courts of the United Kingdom